The Farnese Bull, formerly in the Farnese collection in Rome, is a massive Roman elaborated copy of a Hellenistic sculpture. It is the largest single sculpture yet recovered from antiquity.  Along with the rest of the Farnese antiquities, it has been since 1826 in the collection of the Museo Archeologico Nazionale Napoli in Naples, inv. no. 6002, though in recent years sometimes displayed at the Museo di Capodimonte across the city.  The sculpture in Naples is much restored, and includes around the base a child, a dog, and other animals not apparently in the original composition, which is known from versions in other media.

Pliny the Elder mentions what was presumably the prime version of it as the work of the Rhodian artists Apollonius of Tralles and his brother Tauriscus, stating that it was commissioned at the end of the 2nd century BCE and carved from just one whole block of marble. It was imported from Rhodes as part of the remarkable collection of artwork and sculpture owned by Asinius Pollio, a Roman politician who lived during the years between the Republic and the Principate.  

This colossal marble sculptural group represents the myth of Dirce, first wife of Lykos, King of Thebes. She was tied to a wild bull by Amphion and Zethus, the sons of Antiope, who wanted to punish Dirce for the ill-treatment inflicted on their mother.

Rediscovery and reconstruction

The group was unearthed in 1546 during excavations at gymnasium of the Roman Baths of Caracalla, commissioned by Pope Paul III in the hope of finding ancient sculptures to adorn the Palazzo Farnese, the Farnese family's palatial residence in Rome. This sculpture is dated to the Severian period (A.D. 222-235).

Unlike the discoveries of the Farnese Hercules and the Latin Hercules from this excavation, which were documented as to their location, the only reference to this grouping is from a 1595 engraving by Etienne du Perac of the ruins of the Baths, showing the end of the east palestra, which states: "...in the time of Paul III many beautiful fragments of statues and animals were found that were all in one piece in antiquity ... and Cardinal Farnese had [it] erected now in his Palazzo."

The group underwent a substantial restoration in the 16th century, when Michelangelo planned to use it for a fountain to be installed at the centre of a garden between Palazzo Farnese and the Villa Farnesina. It also could have been adapted for this use soon after it was found, which is supported by descriptions from the Renaissance era. Further restorations were made in the 18th and 19th centuries. In 1883, the original sculpture was noted by Domenico Monaco, curator of the (then) National Museum in Naples, to have been carved from a block of marble measuring 3.66 m × 2.75 m ("12 ft by 9 ft."); after its restorations, the work's perimeter is approximately 3.3 m (10'10") on each side and over 4 m (13') high. As it is today, the sculpture weighs 21.8 tonnes (24 short tons).

It has been argued that the sculpture noted by Pliny in his Natural History could not be the Farnese Bull, which is instead a 3rd-century AD Roman version, made specifically for Caracalla's Baths. Other scholars dispute this, arguing that since the work was originally located in the nearby Horti Asiniani, or Asiniani gardens, which the Pollio family owned, to have commissioned a copy specifically for the Baths would have meant both pieces would have been displayed in very close proximity.  

It is shown in the 1954 film Journey to Italy along with the Farnese Hercules. Henry Peacham in 'The Complete Gentleman' (1634 edition ) says that it "outstrippeth all other statues in the world for greatness and workmanship".

Notes

References
Smith, R.R.R., Hellenistic Sculpture, a handbook, Thames & Hudson, 1991,

External links

 Museo Archeologico Nazionale di Napoli
Census of Antique Works of Art and Architecture Known in the Renaissance

2nd-century BC works
Farnese Collection
Collections of the National Archaeological Museum, Naples
Hellenistic sculpture
Archaeological discoveries in Italy
Cattle in art